Freak Magnet is a studio album by Violent Femmes, released in 2000. It contains the single "Sleepwalkin'".

Originally scheduled for a 1998 release on Interscope Records, Freak Magnet was pulled when the band was dropped from the label. A reissue with live bonus tracks were released via Shout! Factory in 2005.

Critical reception
The Washington Post called the album "stuck in the Reagan decade," writing that "the Femmes still play punky hootenanny-rock with occasional potty-mouthed lyrics to assure frat-boy appeal." Exclaim! wrote that the Violent Femmes "tend to sound like an average band dabbling in a goofy brand of punk, save for Gordon Gano's voice, which anyone could spot a mile away." Pastes Andrew Lisle wrote: "With sarcastic, solid originals like 'Happiness Is' and 'Hollywood Is High', the boys try to achieve former glory on Freak Magnet, falling just short of success." Trouser Press called it "a strong return to form," writing that "the Femmes hang their music in thick, hard-rocking sheets of sound rather than on a skeletal acoustic frame."

Track listing

Personnel

Violent Femmes
Gordon Gano – vocal, guitar
Brian Ritchie – bass, guitar, keyboards, percussion, shakuhachi, vocal, additional recording, cover design
Guy Hoffman – drums, percussion, vocal

Technical personnel
Violent Femmes – co-producer
Warren Bruleigh – co-producer, mixing, additional recording
Pierre Henry – co-producer, additional recording
Tom Grimley – co-producer, additional recording
Martin Brass – recording, mixing
David Vartanian – mixing, cover design
Howie Weinberg – mastering
Roger Lian – mastering
Bill Emmons – additional recording
Mark Mason – assistant engineer
Ken Feldman – assistant engineer
Rich Tapper – assistant engineer
Nicola Stemmer – assistant engineer

References

2000 albums
Violent Femmes albums
Cooking Vinyl albums
Beyond Records albums
Shout! Factory albums